What's a Nice Girl like You...? is a 1971 American made-for-television drama film. It aired on ABC as an ABC Movie of the Week. The film was directed by Jerry Paris.

Plot
Shirley, a fiery Bronx bombshell, has become the target of kidnappers — though she can't figure out why.

Main cast

References

External links
 

1971 television films
1971 films
1971 drama films
American drama television films
ABC Movie of the Week
Films about kidnapping
Films set in the Bronx
Films scored by Robert Prince
Films directed by Jerry Paris
1970s English-language films
1970s American films